Cayambe is a canton in the northeast of the province of Pichincha, in northern Ecuador, South America. The canton is named after the Cayambe, a 5,800-meter-high snow-covered stratovolcano in the east of the canton. The main part of the canton occupies the eastern portion of the Pisque river basin and is surrounded by volcanoes.

The seat of the canton, also named after the volcano, is Cayambe. The economy of the canton is agricultural, based on raising cattle and producing dairy products and growing flowers for export in greenhouses, and also cereals for local consumption. The Swiss food company Nestlé and the Cayambean company Miraflores have dairy-product factories in the city of Cayambe.

The Pambamarca Fortress Complex, several pre-Columbian s (hilltop forts), is located in Cayambe Canton on the slopes of Pambamarca volcano.  Here, the Cayambe people defended their territory from the Inca Empire in a war that took place in the late 15th and early 16th century.

Notable people
Dina Farinango was born in Cangahua in Cayambe, in 1993 and went on to be member of the National Assembly.

References

See also 
 Dolores Cacuango

Cantons of Pichincha Province